Theory test may refer to:

 The two-part theory section of the  United Kingdom driving test
 The computerised test required to obtain a Driving licence in the Republic of Ireland
 Any of the similar tests required in many other countries, see driving test and driver's license.